Acraea intermediodes is a butterfly in the family Nymphalidae. It is found in the Democratic Republic of the Congo (Haut-Lomani, Kabinda, Lualaba) and north-eastern Zambia.

Description

A. intermedia Wichgr. entirely agrees with the type-form of caldarena except that discal dots 4 and 5 of the forewing are placed nearer to the apex of the cell than to the black apical spot and that the female has a broad white subapical band on the forewing. Rhodesia and southern Congo.

Taxonomy
It is a member of the Acraea caecilia species group. See also Pierre & Bernaud, 2014.

References

External links

intermediodes Dominique Bernaud fiche 

Butterflies described in 1995
intermediodes